iHQ Inc., doing business as SidusHQ is one of the leading talent management agencies in South Korea. It was founded in January 2001 by Teddy Hoon-tak Jung. The company is involved in talent management (artist content), and TV drama/music production.

History
iHQ, or SidusHQ, is the successor of EBM, an entertainment company founded by producer Teddy Hoon-tak Jung (ko) in 1997. In 2000, EBM merged with production company Uno Films to become a new entertainment company, Sidus. At this time, Sidus was known as the management company of popular K-pop group g.o.d (as part of a cooperation with music producer and songwriter Park Jin-young of JYP Entertainment) and rising young actors and actresses such as Jang Hyuk, Cha Tae-hyun and Jun Ji-hyun. By 2002, the production and talent management divisions had separated; the production division is now known as Sidus Pictures while the talent management division became iHQ (also known as SidusHQ).

In 2005, iHQ acquired YTN Group's cable TV broadcasting division (YTN Media), and changed its name to present-day CU Media. It expanded into China, opening an office in Beijing in partnership with SK Telecom China in 2007. The branch serves to promote the activities of Korean stars in the Chinese market.

In 2013, iHQ acquired 60% of shares in Wisepeer Inc., owner of the music site monkey3. It also became the biggest share holder (50.01%) in Cube Entertainment. At the same time, CU Media was sold to C&M.

In July 2018, it re-acquired New Able Entertainment. It had previously been spun-off as an independent subsidiary company and was home to the likes of Park So-hyun, Lee Yoo-jin and Danny Ahn. All artists on its roster were transferred to SidusHQ.

Current artists

Actors

 Choi Young-min
 Kim Dong-hyun
 Yang Hak-jin
 Jang Hyuk (1997–present)
 Ji Eun-sung
 Jung Soo-kyo
 Kim Han-jong
 Kim Young-jae
 Oh Kwang-rok
 Park Gun-woo
 Park Hyun-woo
 Park Sang-nam
 Ryu Dam
 Son Jun-ho (2015–present)
 Yoon Joo-bin

Actresses

 Choi Soo-jung
 Cho Ah-young (2017–present)
 Han Ga-rim (2018–present)
 Hwang Sun-hee (2022-present)
 Seo Hye-lin (2020–present)
 Jung Da-eun (2EYES)
 Kim Da-ye
 Kim Hye-yoon (2019–present)
 Lee Chae-young (2018–present)
 Lee Ga-won (2EYES)
 Lee Go-eun
 Lee Yoo-jin
 Lim Ju-eun (2022-present)
 Oh Ah-rin
 Park Se-hui (2020–present)
 Song Chae-yoon
 Yeon Ji-hoo

Entertainers
 Hwang Je-sung
 Joon Park (g.o.d)
 Lee Bong-won

Musicians

Groups
 g.o.d (1999–2003, 2014–present)
 Monogram
 Kevin
 Lee-won

Soloists
 Bigman
 The Nod
 Seo Hye-lin

Former artists

 2EYES
 Baek Sung-hyun (2011–2021)
 Chae Rim (2009–?, 2016–2018)
 Cha Hyun-jung
 Cha Tae-hyun (?–2012)
 Cho Hyoung-ki
 Choi Ah-ra
 Choi Ji-woo (1994–2014)
 Choi Seung-hun
 Daniel Dae Kim
 Danny Ahn (g.o.d)
 Da-som (2EYES)
 Gong Hyo-jin
 Gong Yoo
 Han Eun-jung (?–2016)
 Han Go-eun (2006–2008)
 Han Jae-suk
 Han Ye-seul
 Heo Ji-won
 Hong Hyun-hee
 Hwang Ha-na
 Hwang Jung-eum (2012–2013)
 Hye-rin (2EYES)
 Hyun Woo (2008–2015)
 Hyun Jin-young
 Im Hyung-joon
 Im Soo-jung (?–2011)
 Jang Kyoung-up
 Jason
 Jay Park (2010–2016)
 Ji Jin-hee (1999–2009)
 Jo Bo-ah (2012–2021)
 Jo In-sung (?–2012)
 Jun Ji-hyun (1997–2010)
 Jung Chan-min
 Jung Woo-sung
 Jung Joo-yeon
 Jung Sun-yeon (2009–2014)
 Kim Bo-ra (1995–2019)
 Kim Ha-neul (2018–2021)
 Kim Hye-soo (2000–2009)
 Kim Ji-young (2014–2021)
 Kim Min-ji (2008–2011) 
 Kim Sa-rang (?–2014)
 Kim Shin-young
 Kim So-hyun (2010–2017)
 Kim Sook
 Kim Su-jung
 Kim Soo-ro (?–2012)
 Kim Sun-a
 Kim Sung-soo
 Kim Tae-woo (g.o.d)
 Kim Woo-bin (2012–2020) 
 Kim Yeon-jun (2EYES)
 Kim Yoo-jung (2010–2020)
 Kim Yoon-hye (2019-2022)
 Ko Eun-mi
 Kwon Young-min
 Lee Jong-hyuk
 Lee Mi-sook (2013-2022)
 Lee Sang-yeob (2007–2014)
 Lee Soo-hyuk (2010–2014)
 Lee Yu-bi (2012–2017)
 Lee Seung-ha
 Lee Young-suk
 Lim Seul-ong (2015–2018)
 LUV (2002–2003)
 Moon Hee-joon (2007–2015)
 Nam Gyu-ri (2014–2018)
 Oh Jae-moo
 Oh Ji-eun
 Oh Yeon-seo (2019–2021)
 Park Bo-gum (2011)
 Park Eun-ji
 Park Hee-von (2013–2018)
 Park Mi-sun (?–2014)
 Park Min-young (2006–2010)
 Park Shin-yang
 Park So-hyun (2018–2021)
 Park Solomon (2020–2021)
 Park Soo-jin 
 Park Sun-ho (2014–2022) 
 Park Tae-joon
 Ryu Seung-soo (2018–2021)
 Seo Shin-ae (2004–2016)
 Shim Yi-young (?–2014)
 Shin Min-ah
 Solbi
 Son Ho-young (g.o.d)
 Song Hye-kyo (2005–2006)
 Song Joong-ki (2008–2012)
 Sunwoo Sun
 Sung Yu-ri (2005–2010)
 Um Ki-joon (2006–2021)
 Yeon Joon-seok (2017–2020)
 Yoon Kye-sang (g.o.d) (?–2009)

Assets and subsidiaries

Broadcasting Division
 Cable television channels under the former YTN Media/CU Media
 AXN (in partnership with Sony Pictures Television)
 Comedy TV (ko)
 Dramax (ko)
 K-Star (ko) (formerly YTN Star and Y-star)
 Life N
 Cube TV (in partnership with Cube Entertainment)

Wisepeer Inc.
 monkey3

Others
 APPIA Studio
 Gazi Contents

See also
 iHQ discography

References

External links

Naver 

 
Talent agencies of South Korea
Talent agencies
Labels distributed by CJ E&M Music and Live
Television production companies of South Korea